Mumadona Dias, or Muniadomna Díaz (died 968), was a Galician noble and Countess of Portugal, who ruled the county jointly with her husband from about  and then on her own after her husband's death around 950 until her death in 968. Celebrated, rich and the most powerful woman in the Northwest of the Iberian peninsula, she has been commemorated by several Portuguese cities.

Life 

She was  one of the three daughters of Count Diogo Fernandes and of countess Onega (or Onecca) who had been the tutors of the future King Ramiro II of León. Between 915 and 920 and, most certainly by 926—the year in which they appear together for the first time when King Ramiro II gave the couple the villa of Creximir near Guimarães— she married Count Hermenegildo González.

Hermenegildo died between 943 and 950, and Mumadona governed the county alone after her husband's death. She left it in the ownership of countless domains, in an area that coincided reasonably with zones that would integrate the back counties of Portugal and of Coimbra.

Those domains were divided in July 950 among her six children, giving Gonzalo Menéndez the county of Portugal. In 950 or 951, with divine inspiration, she founded, on her property in Vimaranes, a monastery under São Mamede's invocation (Mosteiro of São Mamede or Mosteiro of Guimarães).  Later she professed her vows there. To protect this monastery and its people from Viking raids, she initiated the construction of the Castle of Guimarães,  in the shade of which Guimarães' burgh was developed, and due to the constant raids, in 968 she gave this castle to the monastery for its protection. Eventually this became the headquarters of the court of the counts of Portugal.

The testamentary document in which she makes the donation of her domains, cattle, incomes, religious objects and books to Guimarães monastery, dated 26 January 959, was important for verifying the existence of several castles and villages in the region.

Notes

References

Bibliography 
 
 
 
 

 
 
 

Counts of Portugal
People of the Reconquista
10th-century counts of Portugal (Asturias-León)
968 deaths
10th-century births
10th-century women rulers